Yvonne Page, known professionally as Jill Day (5 December 1930 – 16 November 1990) was an English pop singer and actress in Britain in the 1950s and early 1960s.

Career
She was born in Brighton, Sussex, England, and found fame in film, radio and television. By 1954, as the former lead singer for Geraldo's Orchestra, she had topped the bill at the London Palladium, and co-starred in the West End production of The Talk of the Town. A Jill Day comic strip drawn by Denis Gifford was published in Star Comics (1954), edited by Gifford and Bob Monkhouse. Day also appeared in the 1955 comedy film, All for Mary. She also sang on the soundtrack of The Good Companions and Doctor at Sea. In 1957, she competed in the heats of the contest to represent the United Kingdom in the 1957 Eurovision Song Contest, eventually losing out to Patricia Bredin. Day was known for her long slim dresses with stiff petticoat under the below-the-knee hem which she wore in numerous television appearances.

In the early 1960s, Day had her own comedy sketch show on BBC Television, The Jill Day Show. She also appeared on Dee Time.

She faded from public view as public taste for pop music changed through the late 1950s and 1960s, eventually retiring from show business to reside in London. She later owned racehorses and had a number of business ventures including a theatrical agency and a baby clothes company.

She died from cancer in November 1990 in Kingston-Upon-Thames, Surrey, England, at the age of 59.

Discography
In March 2003, a compilation album of her best-known songs was released, The Very Best of Jill Day:
 "Sincerely"
 "Happiness Street"
 "I'm Old Fashioned"
 "Holiday Affair"
 "Quiet Man"
 "Mangos"
 "Tear Fell"
 "Little Johnny Rainbow"
 "I Dreamed"
 "Cinco Robles"
 "Give Her My Love When You Meet Her"
 "I'll Think About You"
 "I Hear You Knocking"
 "Hold Me In Your Arms"
 "Wherever You May Be"
 "Far Away From Everybody"
 "Snowy Snowy Mountain"
 "Somewhere In The Great Beyond"
 "Oh Daddy Can I Be Your Dolly Forever"
 "I've Got My Love to Keep Me Warm"
 "Ding Dong"
 "Lonely Nightingale"
 "Promises"
 "Way Of Love"
 "Chee Chee Oo Chee"
 "Whistlin' Willie"

References

External links
 

1930 births
1990 deaths
Traditional pop music singers
People from Brighton
20th-century English singers